

Available titles
The following is a complete list of the 300 Virtual Console titles available for the Wii U in the PAL region (Europe and Australia) sorted by system and release dates.
These titles will not be available to purchase after March 28th 2023

Nintendo Entertainment System
There are currently 89 games available to purchase.

Super Nintendo Entertainment System
There are currently 49 games available to purchase.

Nintendo 64
There are currently 21 games available to purchase.

Game Boy Advance
There are currently 70 games available to purchase.

Nintendo DS
There are currently 31 games available to purchase.

TurboGrafx-16
There are currently 40 games available to purchase.

Update notes

2013
A trial campaign celebrating the Famicom's 30th anniversary began in January consisting of seven cheaper titles, each available for a limited time: Balloon Fight (January 23 to February 21), F-Zero (February 21 to March 22), Punch-Out!! (March 21 to April 19), Kirby's Adventure (April 18 to May 17), Super Metroid (May 16 to June 14), Mario & Yoshi (June 13 to July 12) and Donkey Kong (July 15 to August 13). F-Zero and Punch-Out!! were re-released alongside the launch of the Virtual Console on April 27, followed by Balloon Fight on June 27, two months later.

2014
Game Boy Advance titles were added to the VC service for the first time on April 3.
Dr. Kawashima's Brain Training: How Old Is Your Brain? was available as a free download from June 13 until July 10, when it was removed.

2015
Nintendo 64 and Nintendo DS titles were added to the VC service for the first time on April 2.
Dr. Kawashima's Brain Training: How Old Is Your Brain? was re-released commercially on June 25.
Yoshi Touch & Go was made available via a free download code for purchasing Yoshi's Woolly World from the Nintendo eShop between June 25 (AU) / 26 (EU) and July 23, prior to its commercial release on the same day.
Mario Tennis was made available via a free download code for purchasing Mario Tennis: Ultra Smash from the Nintendo eShop between November 20 (EU) / 21 (AU) and December 17, prior to its commercial release on the same day.

2016
TurboGrafx-16 titles were added to the VC service for the first time on July 28.

See also
 List of Virtual Console games for Wii (PAL region)
 List of Virtual Console games for Nintendo 3DS (PAL region)
 List of Wii games on Wii U eShop

References

 PAL
Virtual Console games for Wii U
Virtual Console games for Wii U
fr:Console virtuelle (Wii U)